Edwin Nelson (September 28, 1881 – September 19, 1961) was a Republican politician from Idaho. He served as the 25th Lieutenant Governor of Idaho.  Nelson was elected in 1943 along with Governor C. A. Bottolfsen. He died in Grangeville, Idaho in 1961.

References

Idaho Republicans
Lieutenant Governors of Idaho
1881 births
1961 deaths
20th-century American politicians